Alan Wilks (born 5 October 1946) was a footballer with Queens Park Rangers.

He signed in 1965 from Chelsea and made his debut in the 2–2 draw with Brighton in December 1966. He was a striker and scored all 5 goals in a League Cup game against Oxford United in 1967.

Alan played 50 league games for QPR scoring 14 goals before moving to Gillingham in 1971, where he was named as Player of Year in 1972. He then played Non league football with Folkestone, Canterbury and Chatham Town until the early 1980s.

References 

Queens Park Rangers F.C. players
Chelsea F.C. players
Gillingham F.C. players
Sportspeople from Slough
1946 births
Living people
Association football forwards
English footballers
Footballers from Berkshire